Jelena Begović (born 1970) is a Serbian molecular biologist serving as the minister of science, technological development and innovation since 2022.

Early life and academic career
Begović was born in Belgrade, in what was then the Socialist Republic of Serbia in the Socialist Federal Republic of Yugoslavia. Her family relocated to Addis Ababa, Ethiopia, for a few years after her birth before returning to Belgrade, where she was raised. After studying for a time at the University of British Columbia in Canada, she graduated from the University of Belgrade Faculty of Biology (Department of Biochemistry and Molecular Biology), earning a bachelor's degree in 1998, a master's degree in 2002, and a Ph.D in 2008. She has published widely in her field.

Begović became the chair of the University of Belgrade's Institute of Molecular Genetics and Genetic Engineering in 2014. During the early period of the COVID-19 pandemic in Serbia, she oversaw the opening of the "Fire Eye" lab, which tested numerous samples on a daily basis. In late 2021, she opened the Centre for Sequencing and Bioinformatics.

Politician
For the 2022 Serbian parliamentary election, the governing Serbian Progressive Party (Srpska napredna stranka, SNS) chose to reserve the lead positions on its Together We Can Do Everything electoral list for non-party cultural figures and academics. Begović was given the third position on the list. This was tantamount to election, and she was indeed elected when the list won a plurality victory with 120 out of 250 mandates. During the election, she was featured prominently in the SNS's billboard campaign in Belgrade. When the assembly convened, she was appointed as a member of the committee on the rights of the child; a deputy member of the committee on education, science, technological development, and the information society; and a deputy member of the environmental protection committee. Her term in the assembly was brief; she resigned her seat on 3 August 2022. 

When Serbia's new government was established on 26 October 2022, she was appointed as the minister of science, technological development and innovation.

In January 2023, she encouraged recipients of Serbia's Fund for Young Talents Studying Abroad to return to Serbia after the completion of their studies to contribute to the development of the country.

Notes

References

External links
Jelena Begovic: Minister of Science, Technological Development and Innovation

1970 births
Living people
Politicians from Belgrade
Serbian biologists
Members of the National Assembly (Serbia)
Government ministers of Serbia
Independent politicians in Serbia